Jánosháza is a town in Vas county, Hungary.

Notable people
 Mavro Sachs - Croatian physician, first lecturer of the University of Zagreb and founder of forensic medicine in Croatia
 Rabbi Mnachem Samuel - leader and rabbi of this village; killed by the Nazis in 1944

References

Populated places in Vas County